Pensiamoci ogni sera is an Italian album by Dalida. It contains two of her best Top 10 hits in Italy: the #1 "La danza di Zorba" and "Il silenzio".

Track listing
 Pensiamoci ogni sera
 La danza di Zorba
 Devo imparare
 Il sole muore
 El Cordobes
 Ascoltami
 Il silenzio
 Flamenco
 Va da lei
 Questo amore è per sempre
 Toi pardonne-moi
 Un grosso scandalo

Single
1965 Canta in Italiano

See also
 Dalida
 List of Dalida songs
 Dalida albums discography
 Dalida singles discography

References
 Dalida Official Website

External links
 Dalida Official Website "Discography" section

Dalida albums
1966 albums
Italian-language albums
Barclay (record label) albums